John James Kelty   (March 10, 1871 – April 13, 1929) was a Major League Baseball outfielder, specifically a left fielder. He played  for the  Pittsburgh Alleghenys of the National League during the 1890 season.

Career statistics
He had a batting average of .237, an on-base percentage of .322, and a slugging percentage of .319. Kelty had a total of 27 runs batted in (RBI). He also had 10 stolen bases, to go with 24 runs, and a single home run. It is unknown whether he threw with his left or right hand, and which hands he hit with.

Player Facts
Kelty, known by his teammates and fans as Chief, only played for a single season at the age of nineteen, playing a total of 59 games, well below the 82 games that the full season was. Kelty weighed in at 175 lbs (79 kg), with the height of 5'10 (178 cm).

Personal Information
Little is known of Kelty's personal life, except that he was born in Jersey City, New Jersey, on March 10, 1871, and that he died on April 13, 1929, at the age of 53. Kelty was buried in Holy Name Cemetery, located in his birth city.

Sources

Major League Baseball outfielders
Pittsburgh Alleghenys players
Baseball players from Jersey City, New Jersey
1871 births
1929 deaths
19th-century baseball players
Worcester Grays players
Manchester Maroons players